This is a list of cities, towns, villages and hamlets in County Fermanagh, Northern Ireland. See the list of places in Northern Ireland for places in other counties.

Towns are listed in bold.

A 
Aghadrumsee
Aghakeeran
Aghanaglack
Agharahan
Arney

B 
Ballinamallard
Ballycassidy
Bellanaleck
Belcoo
Belleek
Boho
Blaney
Brookeborough

C 
Carn
Carrybridge
Clabby
Clogherbog

D 
Derrygonnelly
Derrylin
Derryvore
Donagh
Drumbegger
Drumlaghy
Drumskinny

E 
Ederney
Enniskillen

F 
Florencecourt

G 
Garrison
Glenkeel

H 
Holywell

I 
Irvinestown

K 
Kesh
Killadeas
Killydrum
Kilnamadoo
Kinawley
Knocknahunshin
Knocks

L 
Lack
Laragh
Letterbreen
Lisbellaw
Lisnarick
Lisnaskea

M 
Macken
Magheraveely
Maguiresbridge
Monea
Moylehid
Mulleek

N 
Newtownbutler

R 
Reyfad
Rosslea

S 
Skea
Springfield

T 
Tamlaght
Tattykeeran
Teemore
Tempo
Trory
Tullygerravra
Tullyhommon

W 
Wheathill

See also 
 List of civil parishes of County Fermanagh
 List of townlands in County Fermanagh

 
Fermanagh
Fermanagh, List of places in County
Places